Suh Sung-in (Hangul: 서성인; born July 18, 1959 in Seoul, South Korea) is a former boxer from South Korea.

Pro career
In 1984, Suh became the IBF Super Bantamweight champion by beating Bobby Berna via a tenth-round TKO. He defended his title once before losing it to Kim Ji-won by a tenth-round KO in 1985.

External links
 

1959 births
International Boxing Federation champions
Super-bantamweight boxers
World super-bantamweight boxing champions
Living people
South Korean male boxers